Lewis Township is one of the sixteen townships of Brown County, Ohio, United States. The 2010 census found 2,697 people in the township, 2,446 of whom lived in the unincorporated portions of the township.

Geography
Located in the southwestern corner of the county along the Ohio River, it borders the following townships:
Clark Township - north
Pleasant Township - east
Franklin Township, Clermont County - west
Tate Township, Clermont County - northwest
Bracken County, Kentucky lies across the Ohio River to the south.

The village of Higginsport is located in southeastern Lewis Township, along the Ohio River, and the unincorporated community of Feesburg lies in the township's north.

Name and history
It is the only Lewis Township statewide.

Lewis Township was organized in 1807. Lewis is probably the name of a pioneer settler.

Government
The township is governed by a three-member board of trustees, who are elected in November of odd-numbered years to a four-year term beginning on the following January 1. Two are elected in the year after the presidential election and one is elected in the year before it. There is also an elected township fiscal officer, who serves a four-year term beginning on April 1 of the year after the election, which is held in November of the year before the presidential election. Vacancies in the fiscal officership or on the board of trustees are filled by the remaining trustees.

References

External links
County website

Townships in Brown County, Ohio
1807 establishments in Ohio
Townships in Ohio